Hoàng Đình Tùng (born 24 August 1988 in Thanh Hóa) is a Vietnamese footballer who plays as a striker for Thanh Hóa FC. He represented Vietnam at the 2009 SEA Games.

Honours

Club 
Đông Á Thanh Hóa
Vietnamese National Cup:
 Third place : 2022

 2009 SEA Games: runner-up.
 Millennial Anniversary of Hanoi Football Championship: winner.

References 

1988 births
Living people
People from Thanh Hóa province
Vietnamese footballers
Association football forwards
V.League 1 players
Thanh Hóa FC players
Haiphong FC players
Footballers at the 2010 Asian Games
Southeast Asian Games silver medalists for Vietnam
Southeast Asian Games medalists in football
Competitors at the 2009 Southeast Asian Games
Asian Games competitors for Vietnam